Berhait Bazar is a census town in the  Barhait CD block in the Sahibganj subdivision of the Sahibganj district in the Indian state of Jharkhand.

Geography

Location

Overview
Rajmahal coalfield is shown in the map. The entire area is overwhelmingly rural with only small pockets of urbanisation.

Note: The full screen map is interesting. All places marked on the map are linked and you can easily move on to another page of your choice. Enlarge the map to see what else is there – one gets railway links, many more road links and so on.

Demographics
According to the 2011 Census of India, Berhait Bazar had a total population of 4,732, of which 2,482 (52%) were males and 2,259 (48%) were females. Population in the age range 0–6 years was 623. The total number of literate persons in Berhait Bazar was 3,282 (79.87% of the population over 6 years).

Infrastructure
According to the District Census Handbook 2011, Sahibganj, Berhait Bazar covered an area of 0.25 km2. Among the civic amenities, it had 10 km roads with both open and closed drains, the protected water supply involved hand pump, R/C. It had 334 domestic electric connections, 16 road lighting points. Among the educational facilities it had 2 primary schools, the nearest secondary school (?), senior secondary school at Barharwa 20 km away (?). It had the branch office of 1 nationalised bank.

See also – Berhait Santali#Education

References

Cities and towns in Sahibganj district